SS Alanson B. Houghton was a Liberty ship built in the United States during World War II. She was named after Alanson B. Houghton, the vice president and later president of Corning Glass Works, a member of the United States House of Representatives from New York (1919–1922), the United States Ambassador to Germany (1922–1925), United States Ambassador to the United Kingdom (1925–1929), and a member of the Jekyll Island Club.

Construction
Alanson B. Houghton was laid down on 19 January 1944, under a Maritime Commission (MARCOM) contract, MC hull 2293, by J.A. Jones Construction, Panama City, Florida; sponsored by Mrs. H.R. Pratt, she was launched on 14 March 1944.

History
She was allocated to American South African Lines, Inc., on 15 April 1944. On 14 October 1949, she was laid up in the National Defense Reserve Fleet, in Mobile, Alabama. On 28 October 1971, she was sold, along with 13 other ships, for $513,000 to Union Minerals and Alloys Corporation, for scrapping. She was removed from the fleet 25 October 1972.

References

Bibliography

 
 
 
 
 

 

Liberty ships
Ships built in Panama City, Florida
1944 ships
Mobile Reserve Fleet